Aram Bajakian's Kef is the debut album by guitarist Aram Bajakian.

Reception

All About Jazz reviewer Chris May said, "With Kef, Bajakian is exploring his Armenian musical heritage through its US offshoot, kef—a style developed by the Armenian Diaspora ...The dozen tunes are either written by Bajakian or arranged by him from traditional material. It is an exciting mélange, which preserves kef's roots in providing music for dance, and broadens its stylistic parameters".

The PopMatters review by Sean Murphy observed "The absence of drums is novel and audacious, but considering how much some of this material shreds, it is almost revelatory ... There are no unsatisfactory tracks to be found here, and while some may dazzle or impress more than others ... suffice to say Kef is as extraordinary an album as I can recall listening to in a very long time".

Track listing 
All compositions by Aram Bajakian except where noted
 "Pear Tree" – 2:36
 "Sepastia" – 3:23
 "Laz Bar" (Traditional) – 4:27
 "Sumlinian" – 5:17
 "Wroclaw" – 4:45
 "Karasalama" (Traditional) – 5:16
 "Hayastan" – 5:02
 "Raki" – 3:15
 "Pineta" – 2:30
 "Shish" – 2:09
 "48 Days" – 2:28
 "La Rota" – 5:40

Personnel 
Aram Bajakian – electric guitar, acoustic guitar 
Tom Swafford – violin
Shanir Ezra Blumenkranz - acoustic bass

References 

2011 albums
Tzadik Records albums
Aram Bajakian albums